Drupadia scaeva, the blue posy, is a species of butterfly of the family Lycaenidae. It is found in South-East Asia.

Subspecies
Drupadia scaeva scaeva (Peninsular Malaya, Singapore, Langkawi, Pulau Tioman, Borneo, Sumatra)
Drupadia scaeva cooperi (Tytler, 1940) (central Burma, northern Thailand)
Drupadia scaeva cyara (Hewitson, 1878) (Bhutan, Sikkim, Assam, north-western Burma)
Drupadia scaeva melisa (Hewitson, 1869) (southern Burma, Mergui, southern Thailand)

See also
List of butterflies of India
List of butterflies of India (Lycaenidae)

References

Butterflies described in 1908
scaeva
Butterflies of Asia
Butterflies of Borneo